Gary Martindale (born 24 June 1971) is an English former professional footballer who played as a striker. He has since moved into management, serving as manager and assistant manager at four non-league football clubs in the North West of England.

Playing career
Born in Liverpool, Martindale began his senior career in non-League football with Burscough. He later played in the Football League for Bolton Wanderers, Peterborough United, Notts County, Mansfield Town and Rotherham United, before returning to non-League football with Telford United and Burscough.

Despite having played in the Second Division (now League One) with Notts County, his most outstanding moment came after he returned to Burscough. In May 2003 they reached the final of the FA Trophy against Tamworth. Having started the competition as 400–1 outsiders, they had narrowed the odds but were still far from favourites. They pulled off a shock 2–1 win, with Martindale scoring both their goals.

Coaching career

Formby
Martindale was appointed manager of Formby in July 2010. Without time to rebuild the severely depleted squad before the season began, Formby had a disastrous first few games. Lacking a striker, Martindale reluctantly picked himself for the team. He scored in four out of his first five matches.

Despite turning Formby's fortunes around, including signing notable players like John Paul Kissock, Adam Farley and John Lawless, he felt unsupported by the club and after internal restructuring of the club he resigned in January 2011. He expressed an immediate desire to continue his management career elsewhere.

Vauxhall Motors
Two months later he took up a backroom coaching role at Prescot Cables, before being hired in June 2011 as Assistant Manager of Vauxhall Motors F.C. by their new manager Anthony Wright.

During the 2011–12 season, he  was once more registered as a player for Vauxhall Motors.

Marine
In 2014 he was appointed by Marine as Assistant Manager, again alongside Carl Macauley who was appointed as manager. They left the club in February 2015.

Witton Albion
In October 2015 he was appointed, again as assistant manager, alongside Carl Macauley as manager at Witton Albion.

References

1971 births
Living people
Footballers from Liverpool
English footballers
Association football forwards
Burscough F.C. players
Bolton Wanderers F.C. players
Peterborough United F.C. players
Notts County F.C. players
Mansfield Town F.C. players
Rotherham United F.C. players
Telford United F.C. players
Formby F.C. players
Vauxhall Motors F.C. players
English Football League players
English football managers